The 2020–21 Campeonato Nacional Feminino (also known as Liga BPI for sponsorship reasons) is the 36th edition of Campeonato Nacional Feminino.

Due to the COVID-19 pandemic in Portugal, no teams were relegated on the previous season, and a total of eight teams from 2019–20 Campeonato Nacional II Divisão first stage series were promoted, one from each serie. This led to the implementation of a new format this season including all 20 teams.

Teams

20 teams contested the Campeonato Nacional de Futebol Feminino in 2020–21.

Team changes
Due to the COVID-19 pandemic in Portugal, no teams were relegated on the previous season, and all the eight top placed teams from 2019–20 Campeonato Nacional II Divisão first stage series were promoted.

To Campeonato Nacional
Promoted from Campeonato Nacional II Divisão

 Gil Vicente (serie A)
 Famalicão (Serie B)
 Boavista (Serie C)
 Fiães (Serie D)
 Condeixa (Serie E)
 Torreense (Serie F)
 Damaiense (Serie G 2nd place)
 Amora (Serie H)

Stadia and Location

Format
The new competition format consists of two stages. In the first stage, the 20 clubs will be divided in two series (North and South) of 10 teams, according to geographic criteria. In each series, teams play against each other once in a single round-robin system.

In the second stage, the four best-placed teams of each of the Series advance to the championship group and remaining teams to the relegation series. On the championship group, all eight teams play against each other in a home-and-away double round-robin system, to decide the champions. On the relegation series (North and South), teams start with half the points they had on the first stage and play against each other in a home-and-away double round-robin system, the bottom two teams get relegated, and the 3rd and 4th-placed teams will play the relegation play-offs. The relegation play-offs are played home and away, and the losers are relegated.

First stage
First Stage schedule was drawn on 28 August 2020 at FPF headquarters, and was originally set to be played from 27 September to 6 December 2020 but, due to restrictions imposed in response to the COVID-19 pandemic in Portugal, was concluded on 13 January 2021. Clubs advancing to the Championship Group also qualify to the league cup.

North Serie

South Serie

Second stage

Championship group
Championship Group matches will be played from 19 December 2020 to 23 May 2021.

Relegation Groups
Relegation Groups' matches were played from 17 January to 25 April 2021.

North Serie

South Serie

Relegation play-offs

References

External links 

 official website (fpf)

2020-21
Por
women's
Camp